Roscoe Hill (born November 9, 1994) is an American boxer. He participated at the 2021 AIBA World Boxing Championships, being awarded the silver medal in the flyweight event.

References

External links 

1994 births
Living people
Place of birth missing (living people)
American male boxers
Flyweight boxers
AIBA World Boxing Championships medalists